The 1976 Hyndburn Borough Council election for the Hyndburn Borough Council was held in May 1976.

Results

By ward
… * denotes sitting councillor defeated

 
 

 

 
 
 
 

 
 

 
 

 
 
 

 
 

 
 
 
 

Huncoat

 
 

Church

 

 

Clayton-Le-Moors

 
 
 
 

Great Harwood

 
 
 
 

 
 
 

Oswaldtwistle

 
 
 
 

 
 
 
 

Rishton

References

1976 English local elections
1976
1970s in Lancashire
May 1976 events in the United Kingdom